Liachirus is a genus of soles native to the Indian and western Pacific oceans.

Species
There are currently two recognized species in this genus:
 Liachirus melanospilos (Bleeker, 1854)
 Liachirus whitleyi Chabanaud, 1950

References

Soleidae
Marine fish genera
Taxa named by Albert Günther